Who Dares Wins is a compilation of various rare Bolt Thrower tracks from EPs and other sources: Tracks 1–4 are from the Cenotaph EP, tracks 5–8 are from the Spearhead EP and the tracks 9 and 10 are from the same session as "...For Victory", previously released on "Rareache" (the anniversary compilation boxset of Earache Records) and the Japanese version of ...For Victory. It is released on Earache Records, Mosh 208 on 14 September 1998. The cover art is also taken from the Spearhead EP.

The release coincided with the release of the album Mercenary, which was Bolt Thrower's first album for Metal Blade Records. The band have hence accused Earache of trying to cash in on the band. Also, the album was originally intended to be titled No Guts, No Glory; however because that is the title of a song on Mercenary Earache had to scrap that title. The band recommends not to buy this as they would never agree on releasing a compilation album.

Track listing
All songs written by Bolt Thrower

Personnel
 Karl Willetts – vocals
 Gavin Ward – guitars
 Barry Thomson – guitars
 Andrew Whale – drums
 Jo Bench – Bass guitar

References

External links
 Interview with Jo Bench in which she discusses the release of this album.

Bolt Thrower albums
1998 compilation albums
Earache Records compilation albums